John Douglas Tidball Tisdalle (May 31, 1917 – May 14, 1999) was a salesman and political figure in British Columbia.

Early life
He was born in Victoria, British Columbia, the son of Arthur Tisdalle and E. Mulhulland. In 1938, Tisdalle married Helen Millhouse. Tisdalle published three books of poetry. He was married a second time to Maria.

Career
He represented Saanich from 1953 to 1966 and Saanich and the Islands from 1966 to 1972 in the Legislative Assembly of British Columbia as a Social Credit member.  He also ran once for Parliament, in the 1972 federal election.

Death
He died of cancer at the age of 81.

John Tisdale published the following books:
 Rhymes of Time  (1974)
 Rhymes of Time II (19??)
 Rhymes of Time III (1988)

References 

1917 births
1999 deaths
British Columbia Social Credit Party MLAs
Politicians from Victoria, British Columbia